Richard Forster (born 8 November 1940, in Geneva, Switzerland) is a Swiss photographer and mechanical engineer. He is best known for nude photography in natural environments. His consistency and perseverance produced an opus which brought him recognition beyond Switzerland and France.

Career 
Forster was born on 8 November 1940, in Geneva to father Walter, a linotypist and to mother Marie, born Wohlgemuth. They moved to Geneva in 1939 from the canton of Solothurn.
He graduated in 1965 from the École Technique Supérieure, also in Geneva, as Ingénieur en mécanique (mechanical engineer).
 
He worked in chemical construction development, electromechanical and machine-tool sales, armament development. From 1981, he taught mechanics and other subjects in the Technical Vocational Training Center in Geneva.

Photography 
Forster obtained his first camera at twelve, a Kodak Brownie 127. Later, he switched to Rolleiflex 4x4 (gray) for black and white and the Voigtländer Vito BL for color photography. He designed and made a waterproof box for the Rolleiflex with which he shot his first underwater photos during the summer of 1957, at the French Riviera. In 1958, he took the photography course at the Société Genevoise de Photographie (SGP, Geneva Society of Photography) where he later also participated in teaching and other activities.
 

 
According to Forster he decided to advance his photography by traveling on money saved working as a gas station attendant during his school holidays. In the summer of 1961 he hitchhiked to Hamburg, in 1962 to Italy, Yugoslavia and over the Cappadocia to the Syrian border of Turkey.
In 1963, he and his future wife Anne-Marie Riedel traveled to Scotland, in 1964 they visited the Expo 64 exhibition in Lausanne and in 1965 the most western point of the continent, Sagres in Portugal. In later years the destinations were Switzerland, Sicily, Cyprus, Venice, Paris, the American West in 1994 and 1999, and Ksar Ghilane in Tunisia.
After the death of Anne-Marie in 2007 Forster traveled to Tunisia, in 2008 to China, Kyrgyzstan and Egypt, in 2009 to Vietnam, Kenya and Lanzarote. In 2010 it was Morocco, Paris, Japan; in 2011 India – Rajasthan, Cappadocia and Corsica.
In 2012 he visited Indochina (Vietnam, Laos, Cambodia) and Cuba, in 2013 Iceland. In 2014 the destinations were Spain and Peru, in 2015 Myanmar, Tokyo and Brittany. After he met his new partner he traveled with her to Thailand and Jordan in 2016, in 2017 to Corsica, in 2018 to South Africa, China and Tibet, in 2019 to South India and Colombia.
 
Although Forster's travel opus consists mainly of landscapes and reportage photos, he considers portraits as the best part of his travel photography.

Nude photography 
During the honeymoon in Portugal, 1965, he took the first outdoor nude photos on an Algarve beach. In the seventies he and Anne-Marie joined the naturism movement and during the family summer vacations on nude beaches Forster could meet models for nude photography among acquaintances.
Later he also did not use professional models, he met them during casual encounters and over the Internet.
 

For his nude photography he chose the venues close to the water such as the seashore and rocks, sometimes also non-natural outdoor places such as empty urban spaces or abandoned ruins. In 1987, during a vernissage of a photo exhibition of Serge Nazarieff, Forster met Pierre Strinati, a biologist and caver who was also involved in cave nude photography. This led to own cave nudes in one of the Swiss show caves, the Vallorbe caves. He also experimented with striped light effects on the body and with symmetrical, reflected compositions. The issues concerning the nude photography could be illustrated by his citation:
 

 
Forster's works have appeared in photo magazines and books. He has participated in national and international photo contests and his works have also been selected as photo of the year.

Solo exhibitions

Gallery

External links 
 Photos on Flickr
 Forster's photos on Wikimedia Commons

References 

 

Photographers from Geneva
1940 births
Living people
Nude photography